Sir Arthur Frederic Brownlow fforde GBE (23 August 1900 – 26 June 1985) was an English solicitor, civil servant, headmaster, writer and businessman.

Arthur fforde was educated at Rugby School (SH 1914–1919, Head of School) and Trinity College, Oxford. As a solicitor, he became a partner in the law firm Linklaters & Paines (now known as Linklaters) and also had helped establish the Unit trust. He was appointed a Knight Bachelor in the 1946 New Year Honours, having served as an Under-Secretary in the Treasury. In 1948 he returned to Rugby as head master, remaining until 1957, when he became Chairman of the BBC. In 1964 he retired after a spell of ill-health and was appointed a Knight Grand Cross of the Order of the British Empire the same year.

Occasional verses by Arthur fforde were published later in his life, until his death in 1985.

Notes

References 

 

1900 births
1985 deaths
BBC Governors
Chairmen of the BBC
Head Masters of Rugby School
People educated at Rugby School
Alumni of Trinity College, Oxford
20th-century British poets
Knights Bachelor
Knights Grand Cross of the Order of the British Empire
English solicitors
20th-century English lawyers